Ryszard Grzegorz Jedliński (born 9 September 1953) is a former Polish handball player who competed in the 1980 Summer Olympics and at the 1982 World Men's Handball Championship.

In 1980 he was part of the Polish team which finished seventh in the Olympic tournament.

External links
Profile 

1953 births
Living people
Sportspeople from Płock
Polish male handball players
Handball players at the 1980 Summer Olympics
Olympic handball players of Poland
20th-century Polish people